Hydrophis bituberculatus, commonly known as Peters' Sea Snake, is a species of venomous elapid.
It is found in the Indian Ocean (Sri Lanka, Thailand).

References

Further reading
 Peters, W.C.H. 1872. Über den Hydrus fasciatus Schneider und einige andere Seeschlangen. Monatsber. Akad. Berlin 1872: 855–856.
 Peters, W.C.H. 1873. Über den Hydrus fasciatus Schneider und einige andere Seeschlangen. Monatsber. königl. Akad. Wiss. Berlin. 1872 (December): 848–861.
 Rasmussen, A.R. 1992. Rediscovery and redescription of Hydrophis bituberculatus Peters 1872 (Serpentes: Hydrophiidae). Herpetologica 48 (1): 85–97.

bituberculatus
Taxa named by Wilhelm Peters
Reptiles described in 1872